Voskresenovka is a rural locality (a selo) in Shirokologsky Selsoviet of Seryshevsky District, Amur Oblast, Russia. The population was 63 as of 2018. There are 5 streets.

Geography 
Voskresenovka is located 90 km east of Seryshevo (the district's administrative centre) by road. Sokolovka is the nearest rural locality.

References 

Rural localities in Seryshevsky District